Naval Enlisted Reserve Association (NERA) is a military advocacy group in the United States, who specifically address the agenda of sea-service reservists. Their stated mission is to protect the rights and benefits of enlisted sea-service reservists such as promotion, pay, retirement benefits, personnel strength, and equipment. NERA is a prominent member of a powerful coalition of military advocacy groups dedicated to fighting for service members in the Nation's Capitol.

NERA helps maintains national security by ensuring a strong and well-trained Naval, Coast Guard and Marine Corps Reserve. They are the only military association composed exclusively of enlisted Sea Service Reservists. NERA represents enlisted Sea Service Reservists by providing a singular voice to the Congress, the White House and the Departments of Defense and Transportation regarding issues of benefits and rights.

History 
The association was founded by two Naval Reserve Chief Enginemen, Joe Wasson and Thomas Patton, on March 25, 1957. "We wanted to have an organization that paralleled the one that officers had (Naval Reserve Association) started four years earlier," said Wasson, who joined the Naval Reserve in 1942, serving on active duty during World War II. The headquarters of NERA is in Falls Church, Virginia, near Washington, DC.

Organization 
NERA is headed by a National Elected Council (NEC). The National President is elected and serves for a 2-year term with an option to run for a second term. The other officers elected to the council are President, Vice President, Secretary, Treasurer and National Counselor.  Elections occur bi-annually (every other year) during the National Conference which takes place in the Fall.

NERA is organized into chapters located within all 50 states. The Washington DC based chapter, "Joe Wasson", is named after co-founder Joe Wasson.

Membership 
The Association's membership includes standard, associate, commissioned and complimentary members. Membership is available to enlisted members of the Navy, Coast Guard and Marines. It includes retirees, Full-Time Support (FTS), drilling reservists and associate members supporting our enlisted sea service reservists.

References

External links 
 
 https://www.usaa.com/inet/pages/affinity_nera_landing?akredirect=true

American veterans' organizations